Werner Eggerath (16 March 1900, in Elberfeld – 16 June 1977, in East Berlin) was an East German author and communist politician. He was a member of the Socialist Unity Party of Germany (SED / Sozialistische Einheitspartei Deutschlands)  and its first secretary in Thuringia from 21 April 1946 to 1947, already having held that position in the Communist Party of Germany before its merger with the SPD, to create, in April 1946, the SED. After having been Minister of the Interior of Thuringia since May 1947, he became its Minister-President on 9 October 1947, which he stayed until 23 July 1952 when the state was abolished. Eggerath also served as Ambassador to Romania from 1954 to 1957 and as the State Secretary for Church Affairs.

References

1900 births
1977 deaths
People from Elberfeld
People from the Rhine Province
Communist Party of Germany politicians
Socialist Unity Party of Germany politicians
Members of the Provisional Volkskammer
Members of the 1st Volkskammer
East German diplomats
Ambassadors of East Germany to Romania
Members of the Landtag of Thuringia
Ministers-President of Thuringia
German male writers
International Lenin School alumni
Communists in the German Resistance
Recipients of the Patriotic Order of Merit (honor clasp)
Recipients of the Banner of Labor
Recipients of the National Prize of East Germany
Recipients of the Medal of Merit of the GDR
Politicians from Wuppertal